The Taupō Volcanic Zone (TVZ) is a volcanic area in the North Island of New Zealand that has been active for the past two million years and is still highly active. 
Mount Ruapehu marks its south-western end and the zone runs north-eastward through the Taupō and Rotorua areas and offshore into the Bay of Plenty. It is part of the larger Central Volcanic Region that extends further westward through the western Bay of Plenty to the eastern side of the Coromandel Peninsula and has been active for four million years. At Taupō the rift volcanic zone is widening east–west at the rate of about 8 mm per year while at Mount Ruapehu it is only 2–4 mm per year but this increases at the north eastern end at the Bay of Plenty coast to 10–15 mm per year. It is named after Lake Taupō, the flooded caldera of the largest volcano in the zone, the Taupō Volcano and contains a large central volcanic plateau as well as other landforms associated with its containing tectonic intra-arc continental Taupō Rift.

Activity

There are numerous volcanic vents and geothermal fields in the zone, with Mount Ruapehu, Mount Ngauruhoe and Whakaari / White Island erupting most frequently. Whakaari has been in continuous activity since 1826 if you count such as steaming fumaroles, but the same applies to say the Okataina volcanic centre.  The Taupō Volcanic Zone has produced in the last 350,000 years over  material, more than anywhere else on Earth, from over 300 silicic eruptions, with 12 of these eruptions being caldera-forming. Both the Taupō Volcano and the Ōkataina Caldera have had multiple eruptions in the last 25,000 years. The zone's largest eruption since the arrival of Europeans was that of Mount Tarawera (within the Ōkataina Caldera) in 1886, which killed over 100 people. Early Maori would also have been affected by the much larger Kaharoa eruption from Tarawera around 1315 CE.

The last major eruption from Lake Taupō, the Hatepe eruption, occurred in 232 CE. The date of this activity was previously thought to be 186 AD as the ash expulsion was thought to be sufficiently large to turn the sky red over Rome and China (as documented in Hou Han Shu), but this has since been disproven.

Whakaari / White Island had a major, edifice failure collapse of its volcano dated to 946 BCE ± 52 years. Although significant tsunami's can be associated with volcanic eruptions, it is unknown if the cause was a relatively small eruption of Whakaari or another cause such as a large local earthquake

Taupō erupted an estimated  of DRE material in its Oruanui eruption 25,600 years ago. This was Earth's most recent eruption reaching VEI-8, the highest level on the Volcanic Explosivity Index.

The Rotorua caldera has been dormant longer, with its main eruption occurring about 225,000 years ago, although lava dome extrusion has occurred within the last 25,000 years.

Extent and geological context

Mount Ruapehu marks its southwestern end, while Whakaari / White Island is considered its northeastern limit.

It forms a southern portion of the active Lau-Havre-Taupō back-arc basin, which lies behind the Kermadec-Tonga Subduction Zone. Mayor Island and Mount Taranaki are recently active back arc volcanoes on the New Zealand extension of this arc. Mayor Island / Tūhua is the northern-most shield volcano adjacent to the New Zealand coast, and is believed to have been active in the last 1000 years. It is formed from rhyolite magma. It has a quite complex eruptive history but only with one definite significant Plinian eruption.

Within the Taupō volcanic zone, intra-arc extension is expressed as normal faulting within a zone known as the Taupō Rift. Volcanic activity continues to the north-northeast, along the line of the Taupō Volcanic Zone, through several undersea volcanoes in the South Kermadec Ridge Seamounts, then shifts eastward to the parallel volcanic arc of the Kermadec Islands and Tonga. Although the back-arc basin continues to propagate to the southwest, with the South Wanganui Basin forming an initial back-arc basin, volcanic activity has not yet begun in this region.

South of Kaikōura the plate boundary changes to a transform boundary with oblique continental collision uplifting the Southern Alps / Kā Tiritiri o te Moana in the South Island. A subduction zone reappears southwest of Fiordland, at the southwestern corner of the South Island, although here the subduction is in the opposite direction. Solander Island / Hautere is an extinct volcano associated with this subduction zone, and the only one that protrudes above the sea.

Scientific study

Tectonics

Recent scientific work indicates that the Earth's crust below the Taupō Volcanic Zone may be as little as 16 kilometres thick.  A film of magma 50 kilometres (30 mi) wide and 160 kilometres (100 mi) long lies 10 kilometres under the surface. The geological record indicates that some of the volcanoes in the area erupt infrequently but have large, violent and destructive eruptions when they do. 

Technically the zone is in the continental intraarc Taupō Rift. This has had three active stages of faulting in the last 2 million years with the modern Taupō rift evolving in the last 25,000 years after the massive Oruanui eruption being within two essentially inactive rift systems. These are the surrounding limits of the young Taupō Rift between 25,000 and 350,000 years and old Taupō Rift system whose northern boundary is now located well to the north of the other two being created between 350,000 and 2 million years.

Faults
The multiple intra-rift faults are some of the most active in the country and some have the potential to create over magnitude 7 events. The fault structures are perhaps most well characterised related to the Ruapehu and Tongariro grabens. The recent deposits from major eruptions and lake features mean many potentially significant faults are uncharacterised, either completely (for example the 6.5 Mw 1987 Edgecumbe earthquake resulted in the mapping of the Edgecumbe fault for the first time) or frequency of events and their likely magnitude are not understood. It can not be assumed that just because the rate of expansion of the rift is greatest near the coast that this is where most significant tectonic earthquakes in terms of human risk will be. The Waihi Fault Zone south of Lake Taupō and associated with the Tongariro graben has a particular risk of inducing massive landslips which has caused significant loss of life and appears to be more active than many other faults in the zone.

Volcanism

The north (Whakatane Graben – Bay of Plenty) part of the zone is predominantly formed from andesitic magma and represented by the continuously active Whakaari / White Island andesite–dacite stratovolcano. Although Strombolian activity has occurred the explosive eruptions are typically phreatic or phreatomagmatic.

The central part of the zone is composed of eight caldera centres the oldest of which is the Mangakino caldera which was active more than a million years ago (1.62–0.91 Ma). Other than the now buried Kapenga caldera there are five caldera centres, Rotorua, Ohakuri, Reporoa, Ōkataina and Taupō. These have resulted from massive infrequent eruptions of gaseous very viscous rhyolite magma which is rich in silicon, potassium, and sodium and created the ignimbrite sheets of the North Island Volcanic Plateau. This central zone has had the largest number of very large silicic caldera-forming eruptions recently on earth. During a period of less than 100,000 years commencing with the massive Whakamaru eruption about 335,000 years ago of greater than  dense-rock equivalent of material, just to the north of the present Lake Taupō,  over  total was erupted. These eruptions essentially defined the limits of the present central volcanic plateau, although its current central landscape is mainly a product of later smaller events over the last 200,000 years than the Whakamaru eruption. The other volcanic plateau defining eruptions were to the west, the  Matahina eruption of about 280,000 years ago, the mainly tephra  Chimp (Chimpanzee) eruption between 320 and 275 ka, the central  Pokai eruption of about 275 ka, and the paired Mamaku to the north and east central Ohakuri eruptions of about 240,000 years ago that together produced more than  dense-rock equivalent of material. The southern Taupō Volcano Oruanui eruption about 26,500 years ago produced   dense-rock equivalent of material and its recent Hatepe eruption of 232 CE ± 10 years had  dense-rock equivalent. 

Less gaseous rhyolite magma dome building effusive eruptions have built features such as the Horomatangi Reefs or Motutaiko Island in Lake Taupō or the lava dome of Mount Tarawera. This later as part of the Ōkataina caldera complex is the highest risk volcanic field in New Zealand to man.  Mount Tauhara adjacent to Lake Taupō is actually a dacitic dome  and so intermediate in composition between andesite and rhyolite but still more viscus than basalt which is absent from the zone.

The southern part of the zone contain classic volcanic cone structure formed from andesite magma in effusive eruptions that cool to form dark grey lava if gas-poor or scoria if gas-rich of this part of the zone. Mount Ruapehu, the tallest mountain in the North Island, is a  andesite cone surrounded by a  ring-plain. This ring plain is formed from numerous volcanic deposits created by slope failure, eruptions, or lahars. Northwest of Ruapehu is Hauhungatahi, the oldest recorded volcano in the south of the plateau, with to the north the two prominent volcanic mountains in the Tongariro volcanic centre being Tongariro and Ngauruhoe which are part of a single composite stratovolcano.

Risks

The most likely risk is earthquake associated with multiple active faults, such as within the Taupō Fault Belt, but many faults will be uncharacterised as was the case with the 1987 Edgecumbe earthquake. Earthquakes can be associated with landslides and inland or coastal tsunami that can result in great loss of life and both have happened on the Waihi Fault Zone. The relative low grade volcanic activity of the andesite volcanoes at each end of the zone has resulted in recorded history in both direct loss of life and disrupted transport and tourism. The only high grade eruption in recorded history was atypically basaltic from Mount Tarawera and although very destructive is not likely to be a perfect model for the more typical and often larger rhyolitic events associated with the Taupō Volcano and the Ōkataina Caldera. As mentioned earlier the Ōkataina caldera complex is the highest risk volcanic field risk in New Zealand to man and the recent frequency of rhyolitic events there is not reassuring, along with the timescale of likely warning of such an event.

Volcanoes, lakes and geothermal fields

The following Volcanic Centers belong to the modern Taupō Volcanic Zone:

Rotorua, Ōkataina , Maroa, Taupō, Tongariro and Mangakino. The old zone almost certainly contains volcanoes in the Tauranga Volcanic Centre.
Tauranga Volcanic Centre – Bay of Plenty
Activity commenced here over two million years ago and is now extinct.
Whakatāne Graben – Bay of Plenty
Submarine Whakatāne Seamount 
Mayor Island / Tūhua 
Moutohora Island 
Whakaari / White Island 
Te Paepae o Aotea
Putauaki 
Geothermal field
Kawerau Power Station 
Rotorua Volcanic Centre
Rotorua Caldera, size: 22 km wide 
Mount Ngongotahā 
Lakes
Lake Rotorua 
Mokoia Island 
Geothermal fields
Tikitere/Hell's Gate 
Whakarewarewa 
Pōhutu Geyser (Te Puia)
Ōkataina  Volcanic Centre: The Haroharo and Tarawera complexes impounded the lakes against the outer margins of the Ōkataina Caldera. The Okareka Embayment and the Tarawera Volcanic Complex are inside the Haroharo Caldera which in turn is inside the Okataina Ring Structure, from Newhall (1988), but newer maps show Okataina smaller.
Ōkataina Caldera, size: roughly 27 x 20 km 
Haroharo Caldera, size: 16 x 26 km
Haroharo volcanic complex, northern end of the Okataina Volcanic Center
Mount Tarawera and Tarawera volcanic complex 
Okareka vent
Ōkareka Embayment 
Rotomā Caldera 
Lakes
Lake Ōkataina 
Lake Tarawera 
Lake Rotokākahi (Green Lake) 
Lake Tikitapu (Blue Lake) 
Lake Ōkāreka 
Lake Rotomahana 
Lake Rotoiti 
Lake Rotomā 
Lake Rotoehu 
Geothermal fields
Waimangu Volcanic Rift Valley 
Frying Pan Lake  
Maroa Volcanic Centre: The Maroa Caldera formed in the north-east corner of the Whakamaru Caldera, and the Whakamaru Caldera partially overlaps with the Taupō Caldera on the South. The Waikato River course follows roughly the northern Maroa Caldera rim on one side. The town of Whakamaru and the artificial Lake Whakamaru, on the Waikato River, have the same name too. The paired single event eruption of the Ohakuri Caldera at its north western limits with the Rotorua Caldera added later complexity after this classification was developed. Accordingly later naming, terms this the Whakamaru caldera complex. 
Ohakuri Caldera 
Maroa Caldera, size: 16 x 25 km 
Puketarata volcanic complex 
Reporoa Caldera, size: 10 x 15 km 
Whakamaru Caldera, size: 30 x 40 km 
Geothermal fields
Waiotapu 
Wairakei 
Craters of the Moon (Karapiti) 
Orakei Korako 
Ngatamariki 
Rotokaua 
Ohaaki Power Station 
Taupō Volcanic Center
Taupō Caldera, size: roughly 35 km wide 
Mount Tauhara 
Ben Lomond rhyolite dome (contains obsidian) 
Lake Taupō 
Horomatangi Reefs 
Motutaiko Island 
Geothermal fields
Tauhara-Taupō 
Tongariro Volcanic Centre: Lake Taupō, Kakaramea, Pihanga, Tongariro and Ruapehu are roughly aligned on the main fault.
Kakaramea-Tihia Massif 
Pihanga 
Mount Tongariro and Tongariro volcanic complex 
Mount Ngauruhoe, a main Tongariro vent 
Tama crater lakes, main Tongariro vents
Upper Tama 
Lower Tama 
Mount Ruapehu 
Hauhungatahi 
Lakes
Lake Rotoaira 
Lake Rotopounamu 
Geothermal fields
Ketetahi Springs 
Mangakino Volcanic Centre: The Mangakino Volcanic Center is the westernmost extinct rhyolitic caldera volcano in the Taupō Volcanic Zone and activity commenced at least 1.62 million years ago. The course of the Waikato River crosses this area, between the artificial Lake Ohakuri, the town of Mangakino and Hamilton.
Artificial Lake Maraetai

Other important features of the TVZ include the Ngakuru and Ruapehu grabens.

Note

There is more recently a somewhat different classification:
North part: Whakatane Graben – Bay of Plenty
Central part:
West of the main fault zone:
Mangakino caldera complex; may be transitional between Coromandel Volcanic Zone (CVZ) and Taupō Volcanic Zone (TVZ) (1.62 – 0.91 mio. years old)
Kapenga caldera; lies between the Maroa caldera and the Rotorua caldera, it is completely buried under more recent tephra (circa 700,000 years old)
Okareka Embayment, lies inside the northern end of the Kapenga caldera, but is more usually regarded as part of the recently active Okataina caldera complex
Rotorua single event caldera; Mamaku Ignimbrite (circa 225,000 years old)
Main fault zone:
Ōkataina caldera complex
Haroharo caldera complex
Tarawera volcanic complex
Whakamaru caldera complex
Maroa caldera
Ohakuri single event caldera
Taupō caldera complex
East of the main fault zone:
Reporoa single event caldera; Kaingaroa Ignimbrite (circa 240,000 years old)
South part: Tongariro Volcanic Centre

See also

References

External links

Further information on Taupō volcanics
Tectonic plate information
Earthquake risks
New Zealand's volcanoes: The Taupō Volcanic Centre
New Zealand's volcanoes: The Okataina Volcanic Centre
Maps
Environment Waikato, Regional Council, map

 Map modified from: 
Geological Society of New Zealand & New Zealand Geophysical Society - Fieldtrip 2
 
New Zealand, Taupō and Coromandel volcanic zones

The Taupō Volcanic Zone with Māori Freehold Land (1995) - showing geothermal fields

Taupō Volcanic Zone
Back-arc basins
Geysers of New Zealand
Landforms of Waikato
Subduction volcanoes
Volcanic belts
Volcanism of New Zealand
+
Rift volcanoes
Rift volcanism
Lists of volcanic eruptions
Volcanoes of New Zealand